Gnomidolon peruvianum is a species of beetle in the family Cerambycidae. It was described by Martins in 1960.

References

Gnomidolon
Beetles described in 1960